Triathlon competitions at the 2022 South American Games in Asuncion, Paraguay were held between October 2 and 4, 2022 at the Centro Acuático Nacional.

An individual event per gender and the mixed relay competition was contested. A total of 11 NOC's entered teams into the competitions. The gold medalists in the mixed relay qualified for the 2023 Pan American Games Triathlon competitions (2 athletes per gender).

Medal summary

Medal table

Medalists

References

Triathlon
South American Games
Qualification tournaments for the 2023 Pan American Games
2022